The Philippine Basketball Association (PBA) All-Defensive Team is an honor given annually  to the five players which exhibited outstanding defensive capabilities without regards to position.

Selections

Most selections
The following table only lists players with at least five total selections.

References

Notes

 The Defensive Player of the Year award was first established in 1993.

All-Defensive Team
Awards established in 1985
1985 establishments in the Philippines